Canjilon is a census-designated place  in Rio Arriba County, New Mexico, United States. Its population was 256 as of the 2010 census. Canjilon has a post office with ZIP code 87515. The community is located along New Mexico State Road 115. Canjilon was first settled in 1870, and by 1880, 35 families lived here.

Demographics

Education
It is within the Chama Valley Independent Schools school district.

References

Census-designated places in New Mexico
Census-designated places in Rio Arriba County, New Mexico